Rang Mahal (Urdu: رنگ محل) is a 2021 Pakistani romantic drama serial that first aired on 24 July 2021 on Geo Entertainment.  It is produced by Abdullah Kadwani and Asad Qureshi under the banner of production house  7th Sky Entertainment. It is written by Shafia Khan and directed by Zahid Mehmood. It stars Humayoun Ashraf, Ali Ansari, Sehar Khan and Arooba Mirza. It is digitally available to stream on YouTube.

Plot 
Hailing from a middle-class family, Mahapara is a young, confident and beautiful girl who along with her family lives in a servant quarter provided by Fazal Ali for whom Mahapara's father works as a secretary for many years.

On the other hand, Rayed is a handsome young man and being the youngest son of Fazal Ali is beloved of his family. Despite the class differences between Mahapara and Rayed, both of them chooses to fall in love with each other at a different time in their lives. The mutual feelings between Rayed and Mahapara draw them closer however realities keep them apart. After suffering irreparable loss and stain on her character, Mahapara chooses to fight for herself and her family however years later, fate intervenes and hands Mahapara and Rayed a second chance.

Cast

Main
 Sehar Khan as Mahpara 
 Ali Ansari as Rayed
 Humayoun Ashraf as Sohail  
 Arooba Mirza as Hajra 
Asim Mehmood as Salar

Recurring
Fazila Qazi as Shehla
 Sabiha Hashmi as Zulekha; Mahpara's grandmother 
 Mohsin Gillani as Fazal Ali; Sohail and Rayed's father 
 Rashid Farooqui as Rehmat; Mahpara's father; Fazal Ali's personal secretary (Dead)
 Seemi Pasha as Hajra's mother
 Shajeeruddin as Saleem; Salar's father
 Humaira Bano as Shakeela; Salar's mother
 Tania Amna Hussain as Sara; fiancé of Rayed
 Salma Hassan as Dr. Durdana; Sara's mother and Rayed's mother-in-law to be
 Muhammad Hanif as Shahid Sahab, company senior assistant
 Ellie Zaid as Asma, Mahapara's friend
 Izzah Malik
 Sohail Masood as Fareed, personal assistant Of Fazal Builders
 Urooj Ali
 Faisal Bali as Shakoor, main servant of Sohail house
Nida Khan

Guest appearance
 Shabbir Jan as Mustafa
 Hashim Butt as Saqlain Sahab, company manager

Accolades

References

External links 

 Official website

Pakistani drama television series
Urdu-language television shows
2021 Pakistani television series debuts